Anthony Maurice Mitchell (born December 13, 1974) is a former American football safety in the National Football League. He was signed by the Baltimore Ravens as an undrafted free agent in 1999. He played college football at Tuskegee University.

Mitchell also played for the Jacksonville Jaguars and Cincinnati Bengals.

Mitchell is best remembered for his stellar play as a reserve safety on the 2000 Ravens squad that made an improbable run to Super Bowl XXXV. In a pivotal January 2001 playoff game played in Nashville, Baltimore was tied 10–10 with the Tennessee Titans early in the fourth quarter.  With just over 12 minutes remaining in the game, Titans kicker Al Del Greco lined up for a potential game-winning 37-yard field goal from the right hash.  At the snap, Baltimore defensive lineman Keith Washington bullrushed the Titans lineman defending him, losing his helmet in the process; undeterred, Washington stretched out his right arm over his head, deflecting Del Greco's kick high into the air.  Mitchell snatched the tipped ball out of the air at the Ravens' 10-yard line, raced up the far sideline and, with the help of blocks thrown by backup safety Corey Harris and starting cornerback Chris McAlister, returned the ball 90 yards for a Baltimore touchdown. Mitchell's return catapulted the Ravens to a 24–10 win and set them on the path to their first world championship.

References

1974 births
Living people
Players of American football from Youngstown, Ohio
American football safeties
Tuskegee Golden Tigers football players
Baltimore Ravens players
Jacksonville Jaguars players
Cincinnati Bengals players